Yuva Rathna is a 2002 Indian Telugu-language romantic drama film directed by Uppalapati Narayana Rao and starring Taraka Ratna and Jividha.

Cast 
 Taraka Ratna as Rathna
 Jividha Sharma as Sandhya
 Chandramohan as Rathna's father
 Tanikella Bharani
 L. B. Sriram
 M. S. Narayana
 Sunil
 Chitram Seenu
 Khayyum
 Sudha
 Sana
 Krishnapriya

Production 
This was the first film Taraka Ratna shot for but ended up releasing second. Harikrishna gave a voiceover in the beginning of the film while Balakrishna gave a  voiceover at the end of the film.

Soundtrack 
The soundtrack features five songs composed by M. M. Keeravani with lyrics by  Chandrabose. R. P. Patnaik composed one song ("Chiru Chirugali") with lyrics by Kulasekhar. The audio launch was held on 20 October 2002. Taraka Ratna's uncles Harikrishna, Balakrishna, Ramakrishna, and Chandrababu Naidu graced the occasion.
"Needi 98480" – Shaan, chorus
"Sandhya Sandhya – KK, Hrithika
"Sakhiya" – Kumar Sanu
"Ammagari Nannagari" – M. M. Keeravani
"Sannajaji Puvva" – Sadhana Sargam, Kalyani Malik
"Chiru Chirugali" – R. P. Patnaik

Release and reception 
The film released in November 2002.

Gudipoodi Srihari of The Hindu opined that ""Director Uppalapati Narayana Rao known for his imaginative film making lets us down this time, mainly due to bad story and dialogue" and additionally criticised the acting of the lead pair and the music. Jeevi of Idlebrain.com said that "It's a below average film. But the hero of this film is a liability. And because of the hero, this below average film turns into a bad film".

References

External links 
 

2002 romantic drama films
Indian romantic drama films
2000s Indian films